The 1931 Big Ten Conference football season was the 36th season of college football played by the member schools of the Big Ten Conference (also known as the Western Conference) and was a part of the 1931 college football season.

The 1931 Purdue Boilermakers football team, under head coach Noble Kizer, compiled a 9–1 record, shut out six of ten opponents, tied for the Big Ten championship, and was recognized as national co-champion by Parke H. Davis. End Paul Moss and center Ookie Miller were recognized as first-team All-Americans.

The 1931 Michigan Wolverines football team, under head coach was Harry Kipke, compiled an 8-1-1 record and finished the season in a three-way tie with Purdue and Northwestern for the Big Ten championship. The team shut out eight of ten opponents and led the conference in scoring defense (2.7 points allowed per game). The Wolverines also started a 22-game undefeated streak that lasted until October 1934.  Center Maynard Morrison was selected as a first-team All-American.

The 1931 Northwestern Wildcats football team, under head coach Dick Hanley, compiled a 7–1–1 record and were the third team finishing in a tie for the Big Ten championship. Purdue's sole loss was on the final day of the season against Purdue. Three Northwestern players were consensus first-team All-Americans: halfback Pug Rentner and tackles Jack Riley and Dallas Marvil.

Minnesota guard Clarence Munn won the Chicago Tribune Silver Football trophy as the most valuable player in the Big Ten and was also selected as a consensus first-team All-American.

Season overview

Results and team statistics

Key
DS = Rankings from Dickinson System. See 1931 college football season
PPG = Average of points scored per game
PAG = Average of points allowed per game
MVP = Most valuable player as voted by players on each team as part of the voting process to determine the winner of the Chicago Tribune Silver Football trophy

Regular season

Bowl games
No Big Ten teams participated in any bowl games during the 1931 season.

All-Big Ten players

The following players were picked by the Associated Press (AP), the United Press (UP) and/or the team captains (CPT) as first-team players on the 1931 All-Big Ten Conference football team.

All-Americans

Four Big Ten players were selected as consensus first-team players on the 1931 College Football All-America Team. They were:

Other Big Ten players received first-team honors from at least one selector. They were:

References